The Boscobel Cottage, in Bosco in Ouachita Parish, Louisiana, and also known as Lower Boscobel Plantation, is a historic house built in about 1820.  It was listed on the National Register of Historic Places in 1979.

It was built by Judge Henry Bry.  It includes Greek Revival and Federal architecture.

The listing included two contributing buildings.

References

Houses on the National Register of Historic Places in Louisiana
Federal architecture in Louisiana
Greek Revival architecture in Louisiana
Houses completed in 1820
Houses in Ouachita Parish, Louisiana
National Register of Historic Places in Ouachita Parish, Louisiana